Kokilavani is a 1956 Indian Tamil-language film directed by S. A. Natarajan. The film stars Raghuveer and Tambaram Lalitha.

Cast
The list is adapted from the database of Film News Anandan and from Thiraikalangiyam.

Male cast
S. A. Natarajan
Raghuveer (debut)
K. M. Balakrishnan 
K. Sarangapani
S. V. Subbaiah
V. M. Ezhumalai
Kaka Radhakrishnan
Female cast
Tambaram Lalitha
B. Sarojadevi
P. Susheela
A. Sakunthala
R. Bharathi

Production
The film was produced by S. A. Natarajan and J. G. Vijayam who also handled the cinematography. Choreography was done by P. S. Gopalakrishnan.

The film was produced in Kannada with the same title. B. Sarojadevi featured in the female lead role.

Soundtrack
Music was composed by G. Ramanathan while the lyrics were penned by T. K. Sundara Vathiyar, Lakshmanadas, S. D. Sundharam and A. Maruthakasi. A Thiruvarutpa by Ramalinga Swamigal was included in the film. Playback singers are S. C. Krishnan, T. M. Soundararajan, D. B. Ramachandran, Sirkazhi Govindarajan, Moorthi, P. S. Thangamani, Elangovan, S. R. Ramadas, Baby Saroja, Devaki, T. R. Gajalakshmi and Jikki.

References

External links
 - Song by Sirkazhi Govindarajan

Indian multilingual films
Films scored by G. Ramanathan
1950s Tamil-language films
1950s Kannada-language films
Indian black-and-white films